Hugh Wooldridge is an English theatre director, theatre and television producer and writer, and stage lighting designer. Wooldridge was born in Amersham, Bucks, the son of British composer John Wooldridge and actress Margaretta Scott. He is the brother of actress Susan Wooldridge. Wooldridge currently specialises in large productions, often at the Royal Albert Hall, London.  He also teaches, gives master-classes and runs workshops.

Early career 
After attending Stonyhurst College in Lancashire, Wooldridge trained at the London Academy of Music and Dramatic Art, then assisted directors such as Alan Ayckbourn, Eric Thompson, Frank Hauser and Michael Blakemore. He directed his first play at the age of seventeen. In the first ten years of his career he directed more than sixty productions in London and throughout the UK, by authors including Alan Ayckbourn, René de Obaldia, Pam Gems and Athol Fugard. He was a resident director at the Haymarket Theatre, Leicester, the Thorndike Theatre, Leatherhead, and The Old Vic, London.

During the next ten years Wooldridge ran his own multi-media company, The Jolly Good Production Company (JGPC), which produced plays and TV programmes, managed artistes and published books. During this time he was also responsible for music programmes and programming in the ITV network in the south and south east of England. He also directed international tours of Jesus Christ Superstar and The Rocky Horror Show, as well as national tours of plays by Noël Coward, Daphne du Maurier and Dylan Thomas.

Recent work 
Each year since 1999 Wooldridge has produced, devised and directed The Night of 1000 Voices at the Royal Albert Hall. The production has featured amongst others Michael Ball, Brent Barrett, Len Cariou, Glenn Close, Michael Crawford, Kerry Ellis, David Essex, Maria Friedman, Joel Grey, Brian May, Caroline O'Connor, Adam Pascal, Philip Quast, and Sally Ann Triplett, and the works of Cy Coleman, George and Ira Gershwin, Lerner and Lowe, Tim Rice, Alain Boublil and Claude-Michel Schönberg, Stephen Sondheim, and songs from the productions of Richard Eyre, Nicholas Hytner, Cameron Mackintosh, Trevor Nunn, Tim Rice and Andrew Lloyd Webber.

 1995: Devised and directed A Gala Concert for Hal Prince at the Gasteig in Munich
 1996: Devised and directed the Richard Rodgers Award for Excellence in Musical Theater celebrating Andrew Lloyd Webber for the Pittsburgh Civic Light Opera
 1996: Devised and directed Who Could Ask for Anything More?, the centenary celebration of Ira Gershwin, at the Royal Albert Hall
 1997: Directed with Trevor Nunn The Golden Anniversary – a private event celebrating the Golden Wedding Anniversary of The Queen and The Duke of Edinburgh (Royal Festival Hall)
 1999: Devised and directed Sondheim Tonight in New York and London
 2008: Adapted and directed Chess in Concert at the Royal Albert Hall with Josh Groban, Idina Menzel, Adam Pascal, Marti Pellow, Kerry Ellis and Clarke Peters, introduced by Tim Rice
 2009: Directed the Christmas shows of the UK vocal group Cantabile at the Delfont Room, Prince of Wales Theatre and St. John's, Smith Square

Recent productions at the Royal Albert Hall:
 2011: Kerry Ellis and Brian May's show Anthems: The Concert, for the benefit of Leukaemia & Lymphoma Research, Winner of WhatsOnStage.com Best Solo Performance; also devised and directed
 2011: The Wonderful World of Captain Beaky and His Band, (featuring the words of Jeremy Lloyd and the music of Jim Parker with Sir Roger Moore, Vanessa Redgrave, Hugh Bonneville, Joanna Lumley, Duncan Bannatyne and Alan Titchmarsh amongst others), in aid of Unicef; also devised and directed
 2012: The Night of 1000 Voices celebrating The Music of the Knights introduced by Hugh Bonneville (with Brent Barrett, Daniel Boys, Kerry Ellis, Yngve Gasoy Romdal, Bonnie Langford, Peter Polycarpou, Clive Rowe, Sally Ann Triplett and others); also devised and directed
 2012: Seasons of Love, for Leukaemia & Lymphoma Research, celebrating the real-life Calendar Girls.  (featuring Tim Firth, Willy Russell, John Alderton, Celia Imrie, Patricia Hodge, Sue Holderness, Janie Dee, Stephen Tompkinson, Lesley Joseph, Christopher Timothy, Julie Walters amongst others); also devised and directed
 2013: The Night of 1000 Stars celebrating Harold 'Hal' Prince with Len Cariou; also devised and directed

Between 2010 and 2012 Hugh Wooldridge directed three tours of the play The Haunting, based on stories by Charles Dickens, for Bill Kenwright Ltd.

In 2011/2 Hugh Wooldridge was the Beatrice Carr and Ray Wallace Visiting Professor at A. Max Weitzenhoffer College of Fine Arts at the University of Oklahoma, where he directed the revival of his 1989 production, The Music of Andrew Lloyd Webber.

In 2013/4 he directed the European and US production of BelCanto  produced by Luigi Caiola in conjunction with the Luciano Pavarotti Foundation, Italy.  First seen at the New York City Center in November 2013 and subsequently in Naples, Rome and Paris and European Tour.

In 2016, he directed a production of Twist of Lemmon at The Other Palace, London with Christopher Lemmon portraying his father, Jack Lemmon. In 2017 he conceived, wrote and directed a production for the Young Artists of America celebrating the songs of Tim Rice, hosted by Sir Tim, The Circle of Life, which was first seen at the Strathmore Center, Maryland and was later aired on PBS in the US.  This MPT programme was nominated for three local Emmy Awards – Best Artistic Program, Best Lighting and Best Direction.  It won an Emmy Award for Best Lighting.

In 2018, along with his international masterclass and teaching commitments, Hugh Wooldridge directed Play on Words – a celebration of PG Wodehouse and his fellow Wordsmiths on Broadway – with Hal Cazalet at Live at Zedel/Crazy Coqs and in New York; and another production of Jesus Christ Superstar at Teatru Astra, Gozo/Malta.

In 2019, Hugh Wooldridge produced and directed The Best of Rock Musicals, hosted by Tim Rice, Christopher Biggins and Richard O’Brien at the Eventim Apollo, Hammersmith for the benefit of the suicide awareness charity, The Charlie Waller Trust.

During the pandemic of 2020, he produced and directed 28 short films about Osteopathy – Discovering Osteopathy with Barrie Savory, and a season of new play readings, presented live and streamed globally from the Riverside Studios in London – Riverside Reads.

Hugh Wooldridge has written a play with music with Nicholas Bromley about a girl band, Heads Up!

References

External links
 Official website

Year of birth missing (living people)
Living people
People from Amersham
Alumni of the London Academy of Music and Dramatic Art
Lighting designers
People educated at Stonyhurst College
British theatre directors